The 2020 World Allround Speed Skating Championships were held at the Vikingskipet in Hamar, Norway, from 29 February to 1 March 2020.

Schedule
All times are local (UTC+1).

Medal summary

Medal table

Medalists

References

External links
Official website

 
World Allround Speed Skating
World Allround Championships
2020 Allround Speed Skating Championships
World Allround Speed Skating
World Allround Speed Skating
2020 World Allround Speed Skating Championships
2020 Sprint